Nalanda College of Engineering (NCE) is a government engineering college situated at Chandi town, near Nalanda city in Bihar state of India. It was inaugurated on 19th November 2008 by the chief minister of Bihar, Nitish Kumar. It is affiliated to Aryabhatta Knowledge University. The college is managed by Department of Science and Technology, Bihar.

History
Nalanda College of Engineering is a Government Engineering College working under the Department of Science and Technology Bihar state, India. It was established by the Government of Bihar. Its foundation was laid by the chief minister of Bihar Nitish Kumar in 2008. It is situated on the holy land where Lord Buddha experienced enlightenment and Lord Vardhaman Mahavir embraced Nirvana. It belongs to the land of ancient Nalanda University where students form across the world studied Buddhism.

Campus

NCE Chandi functions from a 51.64 acres (21 ha) campus in Chandi, Bihar.
It is located at 17.3 km distance from the District's main city Bihar Sharif and 42 km from the State's capital city Patna.

Five buildings including laboratory, workshops, girls' and boys' hostels and residence for the principal have been constructed  a at cost of around Rs 40 crores in the first phase. In the second phase the tender process for the construction of another 22 major and nearly a dozen minor buildings at an estimated cost of Rs 180 crore, is being initiated. The initial cost of entire construction was estimated at around Rs 166 crore in 2012 which increased to Rs 220 crore in three years.

Academics 
Nalanda College of Engineering offers undergraduate courses in the field of engineering and technology. Its courses are recognised by the All India Council for Technical Education (AICTE). Admission is through Bihar Combined Entrance Competitive Examination (BCECE). Vocational courses admission, directly to the second year, is through the BCECE Lateral Entry Competitive Examination.

Admission
2019 onwards the admissions are done only through the merit list of the national level competitive exam Joint Entrance Examination – Main.  Students desiring to take admission must appear in the "Joint Entrance Examination – Main" exam that is conducted by National Testing Agency.

Earlier Undergraduate admissions were done through the Bihar Combined Entrance Competitive Examination Board conducted by Bihar Combined Entrance Competitive Examination Board, Under Bihar Combined Entrance Competitive Examination Act 1995 of Bihar government. The Entrance examination has two stages: First stage is the screening test or preliminary test. The screened candidates have to appear in the main examination (second stage). Based on the merit list of the second stage, candidates are allotted seats in different engineering colleges of Bihar.

Admission to postgraduate programmes is based upon the score and rank in Graduate Aptitude Test in Engineering (GATE) conducted by IITs/IISc.

Mentor Institute
IIT Bombay is the mentor institute of NCE Chandi.
It agreed to become the mentor institution after going through the infrastructure facilities of the institute.
IIT-Bombay will provide training/orientation to teachers of the Nalanda College of Engineering.

With the mentorship third-year students of the college will get an opportunity to do a two-month internship at IIT-Bombay.

Departments
The colleges includes the following departments:
 Department of Computer Science & Engineering
Department of Civil Engineering
 Department of Electrical & Electronics Engineering
 Department of Mechanical Engineering
 Department of Aeronautical engineering

Student life

Student societies
Training And Placement Cell = 
Internship Cell
Coding Club
Technical Club
Science Club
Sports Club
Civil Services Club
Entrepreneurship Cell
Startup Cell 
Institute Innovation Cell
Photography Club (Spark)
NSS Club
Chirag (Social activity cell)

Chirag is a non-profit organization which works to educate the needy children in society. This organisation was initiated by students of NCE, Chandi.

Facilities
Computer Center
Central Library
The library has a collection of more than 10000 books and more than 80 Journal covering almost all areas of different departments of engineering. Every department has newsletter e-publication covering the activities of the department. There is one college newsletter every month. Library has been divided into 3 sections: Lending section, Reading section and Reference section. Every department has its own departmental library loaded with a collection of books related to its specializations, soft version of project reports of students and CDs of online course contents.
Hostels
There are total Four girls' and boys hostel.
Sports Facility
There is a sports club in the college.

Festivals
The major annual festival organised by NCEians every year are :
 ATISA : Atisa (Atisa NCE)==  is The Technical Fest of Nalanda College of Engineering.
 PRARAMBHA : (Prarambha NCE) is The Annual Fest of Nalanda College of Engineering.

Alumni

References 

Engineering colleges in Bihar
Education in Nalanda district
Educational institutions established in 2008
2008 establishments in Bihar